The Scattered Islands in the Indian Ocean ( or ) consist of four small coral islands, an atoll, and a reef in the Indian Ocean, and have constituted the 5th district of the French Southern and Antarctic Lands, though sovereignty over some or all of the Islands is contested by Madagascar, Mauritius, and the Comoros. None of the islands have ever had a permanent population.

Also in the Mozambique Channel is the Banc du Geyser, a mostly submerged reef considered a part of the Glorioso Islands by France and the Comoros.

The islands have been classified as nature reserves. Except for Bassas da India, they all support meteorological stations: those on the Glorioso Islands, Juan de Nova, and Europa Island are automated. The station on Tromelin Island, in particular, provides warning of cyclones threatening Madagascar, Mauritius, or Réunion.

Overview

Individual islands 
Bassas da India
Ten unnamed rock islets
Europa Island
Île Europa
Eight unnamed rock islets
Glorioso Islands
Banc du Geyser
Grande Glorieuse
Île du Lys
South Rock
Verte Rocks (three islets)
Wreck Rock
Three unnamed islets
Juan de Nova Island
Tromelin Island

Administration 
Since January 3, 2005, the Scattered Islands have been administered on behalf of the French state by the senior administrator of the French Southern and Antarctic Lands, based in Réunion. The Scattered Islands had previously been under the administration of the prefect of Réunion since the independence of Madagascar in 1960. France maintains a military garrison of around 14 troops on each of the islands in the Mozambique Channel that are claimed by Madagascar. The Glorioso Islands are also claimed by the Comoros, while Mauritius claims Tromelin Island.

France has an exclusive economic zone (EEZ) of 200 nautical miles  around each of the small islands in the Scattered Islands, which together with the EEZ claims for the islands of Mayotte and Réunion totals more than one million square kilometres  in the western Indian Ocean. There is considerable overlap of the EEZ with the neighbouring states.

Sovereignty dispute 
Mauritius, Madagascar, and the Comoros dispute France's sovereignty over these islands. Mauritius claims Tromelin and states that the island, discovered by France in 1722, was not ceded by the Treaty of Paris in 1814. Madagascar claims sovereignty over the Glorioso Islands (including Banc du Geyser), though the islands were never a part of the Malagasy Protectorate, having been a part of the Colony of Mayotte and dependencies, then a part of the French Comoros that had become a separately administered colony from Madagascar in 1946. The Comoros also claims the Glorioso Islands (including Banc du Geyser), as a part of the disputed French region of Mayotte. Furthermore, Madagascar has also claimed Bassas da India, Europa, and Juan de Nova since 1972, and a 1979 United Nations resolution (without binding force) demanded the cession of these islands to Madagascar. Seychelles claimed a part of the Scattered Islands too before the signing of the France–Seychelles Maritime Boundary Agreement.

See also 
 Administrative divisions of France
 French Southern and Antarctic Lands
 List of territorial disputes
 Overseas France

References

External links 
 

2007 establishments in Africa
2007 establishments in France
Dependent territories in Africa
Disputed islands
French Southern and Antarctic Lands
•
Island countries of the Indian Ocean
Islands of Africa
Islands of Madagascar
Mozambique Channel
Protected areas of Africa
Protected areas of Overseas France
Southeast African countries
States and territories established in 2007
Uninhabited islands of France
Irredentism